Xewkija (pronounced and written as Casal Sceuchia)  is an administrative unit of Malta, on the island of Gozo. The population of Xewkija is 3,300 as of March 2014.

History
Xewkija, which is situated between Għajnsielem and the main town, Victoria, is the oldest village in Gozo. It became the first parish outside Victoria on 27 November 1678. It was separated from the Matrix by Bishop Miguel Jerónimo de Molina and Dun Grezz Farrugia from Valletta, became its first parish priest. It became the first district 'contrada' to be known as 'casale' or village.

The name is derived from the Maltese word "", meaning "thistles" or "thorns". Xewkija is famous for its church, The Rotunda of Xewkija, which is dedicated to St. John the Baptist. It is the Seat of the Knights of the Order of St. John, and was built from Maltese stone by local masons and craftsmen. It is the largest in Gozo and its dome dominates the village. Its architect was Ġużè Damato. It replaced an older church. The titular statue of Saint John the Baptist was sculpted in wood by Pietro Paolo Azzopardi in 1845.

On the site where the present church is, it was said that there was a stone known as 'Maqgħad ix-Xiħ'. Near it there is a small ancient chapel known as Madonna tal-Ħniena (Our Lady of Charity) which was dedicated to San Bartilimew. The Santa Cecilia Tower had been in the limits of Xewkija. There is another tower with the oldest sundial in Xewkija. Remains of Tinghi Tower disappeared in the 20th century. These towers date back to 1613. The Gourgion Tower, which was built in 1690, was demolished during the Second World War to make way for a temporary airstrip.

The Majmuna Stone with an Arabic inscription dating back to 1174 was possibly found in Xewkija. It commemorates the death of an Arab girl named Maymūnah. The inscription is carved in a thick marble slab, on the underside of which there is a Roman symbol. Brother Gabrijel D'Alappo translated it into Italian and it was later translated into Maltese. It was sent to the Public Library in Malta in 1845 and brought to the Gozo Museum of Archaeology in 1960.

The Banda Prekursur (Precursor Band) is the oldest organization in Xewkija. It was set up on 13 May 1929. Lorenzo Zammit Haber, Marcell Mercieca, Giuseppe Buttigieg, Giovanni Haber and Tomaso Attard were among its founders. Mr. Lorenzo Zammit Haber was first President and Secretary.

The coat of arms of Xewkija is a shield on a gold background with a red horizontal strip between two thorns, one above and one below. The motto of Xewkija is 'Nemo me impune lacessit', that is, 'No one shall attack me with impunity'.

A helicopter service once ran between Malta International Airport and the Xewkija Heliport.

Facilities
On the suburbs of the village there are the University of Malta (Gozo Campus) and the offices of the Employment & Training Corporation. There are also the Gozo Stadium, the Government Farm, St. Mary's Cemetery and Xewkija Cemetery. There is also an industrial estate which employs hundreds of Gozitan workers.

The rising population in Xewkija needed more building sites for houses and housing estates have been developed at Tal-Barmil, Ta' Ġokk and Tal-Ħamrija.

On entering the village from the main road, one sees the remains of the Tat-Tmien Kantunieri Windmill erected in the times of Grand Master Ramon Perellos y Roccaful. This is unique mill in Gozo because it has points which show the eight principal wind directions.

At Misraħ Imbert one can see the cart ruts, coming from Borġ Għarib, Mġarr ix-Xini, Ta' Ċenċ and Tas-Salvatur.

Twin towns – sister cities

Xewkija is twinned with:
 Castelvenere, Italy
 Modica, Italy
 Pachino, Italy

Notable people
 Dun Guzepp Attard
 Dun Grezz Farrugia
 Maria Grech
 Rosa Magro

See also 
 Gozo Farmhouses

References

External links

Xewkija Parish
Xewkija.net - Xewkija Village Portal
Xewkija Local Council
Banda Prekursur- Xewkija Band Club
Radju Prekursur - Xewkija Community Radio

 
Towns in Malta
Local councils of Malta
Gozo